More Stuff is the title of the second full-length studio release by the group Stuff. It was released in 1977, a year after their debut, on Warner Bros. Records. For the recordings, the group teamed up with Charles Kipps and Van McCoy, who by then had a disco hit with "The Hustle". The band also covers the Stevie Wonder song "As", which appeared on his Songs in the Key of Life disc from the same year. More Stuff, like its predecessor, attained gold status in the U.S.

Track listing
"This One's for You" (Richard Tee) 5:07
"And Here You Are" (Tee, Gordon Edwards) 4:59
"Subway (Cornell Dupree) 3:22
"Love of Mine" (Edwards) 4:05
"Honey Coral Rock" (Eric Gale) 5:09
"Sometimes Bubba Gets Down" (Chris Parker) 3:36
"As" (Stevie Wonder) 3:23
"Need Somebody" (Tee, Edwards) 6:30

Personnel
Stuff
Richard Tee – keyboards
Eric Gale, Cornell Dupree – guitars
Gordon Edwards – bass, percussion
Steve Gadd, Chris Parker – drums, percussion
Additional personnel
Gene Orloff – violin on "And Here You Are"

Production
Arranged by Stuff
Produced by Stuff, Van McCoy & Charles Kipps
Recorded & Mixed by Alan Varner & Alec Head; assisted by Don Berman & Ramona Janquitto
Track 1 published by Bloody Music Inc. Tracks 2 & 8 published by Yangor Music Inc./Bloody Music Inc. Track 3 published by Corerm Music Inc. Track 4 published by Yangor Music Inc. Track 5 published by Gale Pyramid Music Inc. Track 6 published by M'Bubba Music Inc. Track 7 published by Jobete Music Inc./Black Bull Music Inc.

References

1977 albums
Warner Records albums